Satyrus ferula, the great sooty satyr, is a butterfly of the family Nymphalidae.

Description
The length of the forewings is 25 to 30 mm. This species shows an evident sexual dimorphism and the males are much more close to each other in appearance than the females. The wings of the males are usually dark brown on both surfaces, while in the female the wings are paler, with broad greyish bands on the undersides of the hindwings. On both sides of the forewings they have two-four black ocelli with white pupils, the first one much larger than the lower ones.

The flight period extends from June to early September and the butterflies lay their eggs on the grass. The larvae are recorded as feeding on various grasses, including Stipa, Festuca, Bromus erectus and Deschampsia caespitosa. (Higgins, Riley, 1982)

Distribution
It is found in southern Europe, Morocco, Asia Minor, Iran, Kazakhstan, Central Asia, Transbaikal, western China and the Himalayas.

Habitat

References
Lionel G. Higgins and Norman D. Riley (1988) Field Guide to the Butterflies of Britain and Europe Collins, London 
"Satyrus Latreille, 1810" at Markku Savela's Lepidoptera and Some Other Life Forms
Fauna Europaea

External links
Butterflies of France
Butterfly-guide
Eurobutterflies
Lepiforum.de
Pyrgus.de
S. ferula on Szmn.eco

Fauna of Pakistan
Satyrini
Butterflies described in 1793
Butterflies of Asia
Butterflies of Europe
Taxa named by Johan Christian Fabricius